The Okean Shipyard located in Mykolaiv, Ukraine is the third major ship construction yard in the area. It operates modern production facilities supplied by world known companies and it has a medium and heavy tonnage production line. The yard has constructed many different types of vessels to include non-self propelled barges, sea rescue tugs, timber-carriers, fish-processing factories, bulk carriers, and research ships.

The shipyard was established in the 1950s and has specialized in large merchant ships to include the oil/ore carriers of the Boris Butoma class (130,000 DWT).

History 

The factory was started in 1951.

In 1955, a lateral transfer and trigger device (slip) was installed.

From 1952 – 1972 more than 200 ships were built, these included; 7 bulk carriers type “Irgiz”, 46 reefers type “Tavriya”, 14 timber-carriers type “Sibirles” (for the USSR Navy), 15 fishing trawlers type “Altay” (for the Murmansk trawler fleet).

In the 1970s the yard went through a massive reconstruction. In 1972, one of the largest dry docks in Europe was commissioned, this allowed for a second line to be installed. At the same time, fabrication continued of fishing trawlers for the Murmansk fleet and fabrication began of eight large ore carriers type “Zoe Kosmodemyanskaya”, two of which were for export.

In 1974, 18 vessels of a new series of super-trawlers type “Gorizont” (for Murmansk fleet) were constructed. From 1977, the yard built 26 ore carriers of type “Hariton” for Black Sea Shipping. Research vessels were fabricated for the Moscow Sonar Institute for oceanographic research. Fish processing bases were constructed for the Far East and installed a new slip.

In 1997, Okean produced bulk carriers of type Panamax.

In the fall of 2000, a tender was issued for 78% for the company. In October 2000, an agreement was signed between Damen Shipyards Group and the State Property Fund of Ukraine. The shipyard was renamed as Damen Shipyards Okean. In 2001, Damen Shipyards Group purchased additional shares of Okean, gaining 98.7% control of the factory.

Since August 2006 until July 2008 the controlling share of the company has belonged to a Norwegian group, Aker Yards ASA. During this period, the yard launched a total of 13 ships.

In the fall of 2008 the yard became part of Wadan Yards Group AS.

From 2009 to 2010, 24 self-propelled dry cargo twin-mixed (river-sea) navigation vessels were fabricated for Nibulon.
On March 18, 2011, the yard was renamed Nikoliavsky shipbuilding yard Okean.

In May 2011, a series of multi-function pushers were displayed for Nibulon. A total of 13 vessels were ordered for Russian company Technogarant, including pontoons and dreggers.

Legal challenges to the former transfers of ownership, to a  company in the British Virgin Isles
The Ukrainian shipyard was transferred to different companies in the weeks before konkursåpning (bankruptcy proceedings, in March 2010), and eventually was transferred to a company in the British Virgin Isles—Dartwell. ( Templestowe Trading Corp hired the lawyers that transferred the Ukrainian shipyard.)

Johan Ratvik was appointed administrator, and he asked Økokrim and the Oslo Police District to investigate for bounndragelse (withholding assets from the estate).

The estate of the bankrupted Norwegian company (konkursboet) made a deal with Kostjantin Zjevago: Zjevago acquired claims of 50 million euro that the bankrupted company has against the Ukrainian shipyard, in addition to Zjevago receiving the shares in Okean—the company that owned 98.7% of the Ukrainian shipyard. If Zjevago is successful in recouping the assets, then the bankrupted estate will get a share of that.

In a spring 2012 press release Tom Einertsen announced Zjevago's lawsuit, saying "The transfer of shares and loans were part of an operation to withhold (unndra) great assets from creditors. The transfers were illegal. Our goal is to get the shipyard back." Zjevago has sued, in Amsterdam, five companies and a Swiss lawyer. In New York, Zjevago initiated a discovery court process, to demand access to the documentation of a U.S. law firm that assisted in transferring the ownership of the shipyard, to companies—first in the British Virgin Isles, then Panama, then Netherlands, and then back again to the British Virgin Isles. Court hearings in New York are scheduled to proceed in July 2013.

Layout 
The shipyard is located in the southern portion of the city, in the Korablenom region, downstream of the Southern Bug river, on the left bank. The total area of the plant is 101 hectares with an additional water area of 42 hectares. The total length of the outfitting quays is more than 600 metres.
There are two SZMT (Krasnoyarsk) 300 ton (530?) lift each gantry cranes.

See also 
 Wadan Yards
 List of ships of Russia by project number
 List of Soviet and Russian submarine classes

References 

Buildings and structures in Mykolaiv
Shipbuilding companies of Ukraine
Shipbuilding companies of the Soviet Union
Ukrainian brands
Shipbuilding companies of Imperial Russia